De Hoef is a hamlet in the Dutch province of North Brabant. It is located in the municipality of Someren, about 1 km west of the town of Someren.

De Hoef is not a statistical entity, and the postal authorities have placed it under Someren. It has no place name signs, and consists of 35 houses.

References

Populated places in North Brabant
Someren